A penumbral lunar eclipse took place on 10 January 2020. It was the first of four penumbral lunar eclipses in 2020. The moon’s apparent diameter was larger than average because occurred only 3 days before perigee (Perigee on 13 January 2020) and its distance was 375,887 km (233,565 mi).

Visibility

Gallery

Related eclipses

Eclipses of 2020 
 A penumbral lunar eclipse on 10 January.
 A penumbral lunar eclipse on 5 June.
 An annular solar eclipse on 21 June.
 A penumbral lunar eclipse on 5 July.
 A penumbral lunar eclipse on 30 November.
 A total solar eclipse on 14 December.

Tzolkinex 
 Preceded: Lunar eclipse of 28 November 2012
 Followed: Lunar eclipse of 20 February 2027

Half-Saros cycle 
 Preceded: Solar eclipse of 4 January 2011
 Followed: Solar eclipse of 14 January 2029

Tritos 
 Preceded: Lunar eclipse of 9 February 2009
 Followed: Lunar eclipse of 9 December 2030

Lunar Saros 144 
 Preceded: Lunar eclipse of 30 December 2001
 Followed: Lunar eclipse of 21 January 2038

Inex 
 Preceded: Lunar eclipse of 30 January 1991
 Followed: Lunar eclipse of 20 December 2048

Triad 
 Preceded: Lunar eclipse of 12 March 1933
 Followed: Lunar eclipse of 11 November 2106

Lunar year series

Saros series 
It is part of Saros cycle 144.

Half-Saros cycle
A lunar eclipse will be preceded and followed by solar eclipses by 9 years and 5.5 days (a half saros). This lunar eclipse is related to two partial solar eclipses of Solar Saros 151.

See also 
List of lunar eclipses and List of 21st-century lunar eclipses

References

External links 
 
 Hermit eclipse: Saros cycle 144
 Hermit eclipse: 10 Jan 2020  - Penumbral Lunar Eclipse

2020-01
2020 in science
January 2020 events